A. Wynn Howell (born Albert Wynn Howell; March 24, 1912 – May 31, 1989) was an architect with his own firm, in Lakeland, Florida from 1952 to 1965. He became an architect via private study and a seven-year apprenticeship to three successive established architects in the central Florida area immediately after World War II. He was a member of the American Institute of Architects (AIA) from 1954 to 1967 and in 1973. He was vice-president of its Central Florida chapter during 1958–59 and president during 1960–61. He was director of the entire Florida Association of Architects during 1962–63.

His self-selected notable buildings, all in central Florida, were Rochelle Junior and Senior High School, Lakeland (1955); Saint Agnes Episcopal Church, Sebring (1959); Saint Edward's Episcopal Church, Mount Dora (1959); Lincoln Avenue Elementary School, Lakeland (1960); Placid Tower, Lake Placid (1960); and University Lutheran Church, Gainesville (1961). The last building listed, University Lutheran Church, has been selected by Envision Heritage of the University of Florida for digital preservation. In 1953, he proposed a design for the Citrus Tower in Clermont with two observation floors supported by a giant cylinder that visitors could walk up using an external spiral stairway – it was rejected.

Howell was born in Elba, Alabama. He retired and moved to Menlo Park, California in 1966. He died in Kershaw, South Carolina and is buried in Quaker Cemetery, Camden, South Carolina.

References

20th-century American architects
Architects from Florida
People from Lakeland, Florida
1912 births
1989 deaths